The Military District of Kaschau was one of the administrative units of the Habsburg Kingdom of Hungary from 1850 to 1860. The seat of the district was Kaschau (Kassa, Cassovia, now Košice). It included territories of present-day Slovakia, Hungary and Ukraine.

See also
Administrative divisions of the Kingdom of Hungary

External links
Map
Map

1850 establishments in Hungary
Military units and formations disestablished in 1860
19th century in Hungary
Military history of Hungary
History of Košice
Geographic history of Slovakia
Political history of Ukraine
19th century in Slovakia